Coronaric acid (isoleukotoxin) is a mono-unsaturated, epoxide derivative of the di-saturated fatty acid, linoleic acid (i.e. 9(Z),12(Z) octadecadienoic acid.  It is a mixture of the two optically active isomers of 12(Z) 9,10-epoxy-octadecenoic acid.  This mixture is also termed 9,10-epoxy-12Z-octadecenoic acid or 9(10)-EpOME and when formed by or studied in mammalians, isoleukotoxin.

Occurrence
Coronaric acid is found in the seed oils derived from plants in sunflower family such as (Helianthus annuus) and Xeranthemum annuum.

Coronaric acid is also formed by the cells and tissues of various mammalian (including humans) species through the metabolism of linoleic acid by cytochrome P450 (CYP) epoxygenase enzymes.  These CYPs (CYP2C9 and probably other CYPs that metabolize polyunsaturated fatty acids to epoxides) metabolize linoleic acid to (+)12S,13R-epoxy-9(Z)-octadecenoic acid and (-)12R,13S-epoxy-9(Z)-octadecenoic acid, i.e. the (+) and (-) epoxy optical isomers of coronaric acid.  When studied in this context, the optical isomer mixture is often termed isoleukotoxin.  This same CYP epoxygenases concurrently  attack linoleic acid at the carbon 9,10 rather than 12,13 double bond of linoleic acid to form a mixture of (+) and (-) epoxy optical isomers viz., 9S,10R-epoxy-12(Z)-octadecenoic and 9R,10S-epoxy-12(Z)-octadecenoic acids.  This (+) and (-) optical mixture is often termed vernolic acid or when studied in plants and leukotoxin when studied in mammals.

Coronoric acid is found in urine samples from healthy human subjects and increases 3- to 4-fold when these subjects are treated with a salt-loading diet.

Coronaric and vernolic acids also form non-enzymatically when linoleic acid is exposed to oxygen and/or UV radiation as a result of the spontaneous process of autooxidation.  This autoxidation complicates studies in that it is often difficult to determine if these epoxy fatty acids identified in linoleic acid-rich plant and mammalian tissues represent actual tissue contents or are artifacts formed during their isolation and detection.

Metabolism
In mammalian tissue, coronaric acid is metabolized to its two corresponding dihydroxy stereoisomers, 12S,13R-dihydroxy-9(Z)-octadecenoic and 12R,13S-dihydroxy-9(Z)-octadecenoic acids, by soluble epoxide hydrolase within minutes of its formation.  The metabolism of coronaric acid to these two products, collectively termed isoleukotoxin diols, appears to be critical to coronaric acid's toxicity, i.e. the diols are the toxic metabolites of the non-toxic or far less toxic coronaric acid.

Activities

Toxicities
At very high concentrations, the linoleic acid-derived set of optical isomers, coronaric acid (i.e. isoleukotoxin), possesses activities similar to that of other structurally unrelated leukotoxins viz., It is toxic to leukocytes and other cell types and when injected into rodents produce multiple organ failure and respiratory distress.  These effects appear due to its conversion to its dihydroxy counterparts, 9S,10R- and 9R,10S-dihydroxy-12(Z)-octadecenoic acids by soluble epoxide hydrolase.  Some studies suggest but have not yet proven that isoleukotoxin, acting primarily if not exclusively through its dihydroxy counterparts, is responsible for or contribute to multiple organ failure, the acute respiratory distress syndrome, and certain other cataclysmic diseases in humans (see epoxygenase section on linoleic acid).  Vernolic acid (i.e. leukotoxin) shares a similar metabolic fate in being converted by soluble epoxide hydrolase to its dihydroxide counterparts and toxic actions of these hydroxide counterparts.

Other activities
At lower concentrations, isoleukotoxin and its dihydroxy counterparts can protect from the toxic actions cited above that occur at higher concentrations of isoleukotoxin and leukotoxin; they may also share with the epoxides of arachidonic acid, i.e. the epoxyeicosatreienoates (see Epoxyeicosatrienoic acids), anti-hypertension activities.

References

Fatty acids
Epoxides